is a private university in Japan. Its headquarters are on its campus in Bunkyo, Tokyo, for the School of Medicine and in Inzai, Chiba, for the School of Health and Sports Science. The university was established in 1838 for medical and in 1946 for other departments. It is nicknamed Jundai.

Campuses
Hongō-Ochanomizu Campus: Bunkyo, Tokyo, 
Sakura Campus: Inzai, Chiba, 
Urayasu Campus:Urayasu, Chiba, 
Mishima Campus: Mishima, Shizuoka,

Faculties
Faculty of Medicine
Faculty of Health and Sports Science
Faculty of Health Care and Nursing
Faculty of Health Sciences and Nursing
Faculty of International Liberal Arts

The Juntendo University Graduate School of Medicine has granted doctorates since 1963, and the total numbers of the two types doctorate holders (甲 Kou and 乙 Otsu) has reached reach 1,897 and 2,394, respectively, as of 2017.

Notable alumni

Athletes
Masatada Ishii, Manager of Buriram United
Takehiro Kashima, gymnast 
Ryōhei Katō, gymnast
Hiroshi Nanami, football player
Reo Hatate, football player
Tatsuya Hasegawa, football player
Daichi Suzuki, swimmer, Olympic gold medalist
Yusuke Suzuki, racewalker
Shinji Takahira, sprinter, Olympic bronze medalist at the 4 × 100 metres relay
Yusuke Tanaka, gymnast
Hiroyuki Tomita, gymnast 
Isao Yoneda, gymnast
Kazuma Kaya, gymnast
Kakeru Tanigawa, gymnast
Wataru Tanigawa, gymnast
Daiki Hashimoto, gymnast, Olympic gold medalist

References

External links

 

Educational institutions established in 1946
Universities and colleges in Tokyo
Private universities and colleges in Japan
Universities and colleges in Chiba Prefecture
1946 establishments in Japan
Urayasu, Chiba
Inzai
Mishima, Shizuoka